Maurice Bandaman (born April 19, 1962) is an Ivorian writer, novelist, playwright and politician.

Life 
He was born in Toumodi, Ivory Coast. He was awarded the "Grand prix littéraire d'Afrique noire" in 1993. From 2000 to 2004, he was President of the Writers' Association of Côte d'Ivoire (AECI). In May 2011, Maurice Bandaman became part of the Guillaume Soro government as Minister of Culture and Francophone. On 13 March 2012, he was renewed for the same position in the government of Jeannot Kouadio-Ahoussou.

His work is subject to a global study by Pierre N'Da: Écriture romanesque de Maurice Bandaman, ou La quête d'une esthétique africaine moderne.

Works

Novels 
 Une femme pour une médaille, recueil de nouvelles
 MêMe au Paradis, on pleure quelquefois (2000)
 La bible Et le fusil
 Le fils de La femme−mâle
 L'amour est toujours ailleurs
 CôTe d'Ivoire: chronique d'une guerre annoncée

Theater 
 La Terre qui pleure (finalist of RFI’S contest In 1998)
 Au nom de La terre

Poetry 
 Nouvelles chansons d'amour

Children book 
 Sikagnima, La fille aux larmes d'or

References 

Ivorian writers
Ivorian writers in French
1962 births
Living people
People from Lacs District
Ivorian male writers